Dzi bead (Tib. གཟི།; pronounced "zee"; alternative spelling: gzi) is a type of stone bead of uncertain origin worn as part of a necklace and sometimes as a bracelet. In several Central Asian cultures, including that of Tibet, the bead is considered to provide positive spiritual benefit.  These beads are generally prized as protective amulets and are sometimes ground into a powder to be used in traditional Tibetan medicine.  Beads subject to this process have small "dig marks" where a portion of the bead has been scraped or ground away to be included in the medicine.  Some dzi exhibit grinding and polishing of one or both ends, again the result of reduction for use in traditional Tibetan medicine or, in some cases, due to the bead's use as a burnishing tool in the application of gold leaf to thanka paintings or gilt bronze statuary.

The most highly prized dzi beads are those of ancient age, made of natural agate. The original source of these beads is a mystery. While the traditional, ancient-style beads are greatly preferred, new modern-made dzi are gaining popularity among Tibetans.

Names
The meaning of the Tibetan word "dzi" [གཟི།] translates to "shine, brightness, clearness, splendor."  In Mandarin Chinese, dzi are called "heaven's bead" or "heaven's pearl" (天珠; tiān zhū).

Design

Dzi beads are made from agate, and may have decorative symbols composed of circles, ovals, squares, waves or zig zags, stripes, lines, diamonds, dots, and various other archetypal and symbolic patterns. Colors mainly range from brown to black, with the pattern usually in ivory white. Dzi beads can appear in different colours, shapes, and sizes; the surface is usually smooth and waxy, presumably resulting from wear over a long period of time.

Sometimes the natural patterns (usually "layered" swirls) of the agate can be seen underneath or behind the decorative symbols and designs, and sometimes not. Some dzi beads exhibit what are referred to as "blood spots," which are tiny red dots in the white areas, indicative of iron content. This is a highly desirable characteristic among collectors, but relatively rare. Another desirable effect is "Nāga skin," in which the surface of the bead exhibits tiny circular weathering marks  that resemble scales. Some dzi beads are simply polished agate, with no other decoration than the natural banding of the stone.

The number of "eyes," circular designs on the stone, is considered significant. The symbolic meaning of these beads is based on the number and arrangement of the dots.

Origin
Dzi stones made their first appearance between 2000 and 1000 BC, in ancient India: a few hundred thousand were supposedly brought back by Tibetan soldiers from Persia during a raid. The malicious effect of the “evil eye” was taken very seriously by these people. Dzi were considered to counteract the evil eye. The artisans who made the dzi created amulets with “eyes” on them as a “fight fire with fire” form of protection. Artisans used agate as the base stone, and then embellished the beads lines and shapes using ancient methods that remain mysterious. Treatments may have included darkening with plant sugars and heat, bleaching and white line etching with natron, and protecting certain areas with grease, clay, wax or a similar substance.  A hole was drilled before the bead was decorated as drilling caused most breakage during the production process, and holes were also useful for stringing and dipping numerous beads as a step in coloration.  The earliest holes were conical and done with solid drill bits drilling from both ends and, hopefully, meeting near the center of the bead.  Very small drill tips of chipped flint were used without abrasives and numerous other materials, regardless of hardness, when used with abrasives.  Neolithic era beads were also drilled with hollow, tubular abrasion driven bits of reed and, later, during the Chalcolithic, copper.  These drilled a hole with a core of agate inside the tubular drill.  Tubular bit holes were parallel walled rather than conical, but also done from both ends.  Both methods required arduous work done with a bow drill, with time and effort being determined by hardness of abrasive, from ground sand (quartz) to corundum.

Although the geographic origin of dzi beads is uncertain, it is accepted that they are now called "Tibetan beads," just like "Tibetan coral," which also came to Tibet from elsewhere. Tibetans cherish these beads and consider them hereditary gems. In this way they have survived thousands of years, being worn by hundreds of individual people. Dzi are found primarily in Tibet, but also in neighbouring Bhutan, Nepal, Ladakh and Sikkim.Although Dzi type agate beads were made in the Indus Valley during the Harappan period and at various locations rich in agate deposits in India, such as in Khambhat, since their Neolithic periods, the earliest archaeologically controlled find of an agate bead with Dzi style decoration of straight and curved lines and circular eye found has been from a Saka culture excavation (Uigarak) in Kazakhstan, dated 7th - 5th C. BCE.   These were said to be imports from India, reflecting long distance trade with the more nomadic Saka or Scythian tribes.

Sometimes shepherds and farmers find dzi beads in the soil or in the grasslands. Because of this, some Tibetans traditionally believe or believed that dzi are naturally formed, not man-made

Since knowledge of the bead is derived from several differing oral traditions, the beads have provoked controversy regarding their source, their method of manufacture and even their precise definition. In Tibetan culture these beads are believed to attract local protectors, dharmapalas or deities or maybe beneficial ghosts, ancestors or even bodhisattvas. Because of this, dzi beads are always treated with respect.

New dzi

It has been reported that  modern era dzi style beads were made in Idar Oberstein, Germany at least as early as the 19th C.  The German agate-cutters at Idar-Oberstein plied their trade since the Roman Period.  They brought the coloring of agates to a science and the cutting and drilling to the mechanical level of perfection for which Germans are known.

Due to the questionable origin of most hand made dzi beads and the high demand for them, there has been relatively recent reproduction reported in Asia. The most convincing replica of ancient dzi beads came from Taiwan during the 1990s. China has also produced some good-quality dzi beads since about 2006.

A nice dzi should be made of good quality agate with the cutting, drilling and decorating taking many days. Modern methods and technology such as lasers, modern sugars and chemicals, and vacuum chambers can produce very good results. The waxy appearance is still desirable but is sometimes lacking. Some especially well-made new dzi are accepted by Tibetans because it is safe to wear them in public since they look like ancient dzi. Some claim the new dzi function with the same efficacy as the old ones; others believe the protective energies of ancient dzi can move into a new dzi, if the stone is of the same quality or better and the two beads are kept together or when binding rituals are performed.

Dzi are also popular in China, Taiwan, Thailand and Singapore. Genuine ancient dzi are too expensive for most Tibetans; those who have not owned dzi for generations can no longer afford to buy them. Some of the new dzi have become highly collectible resulting in much higher prices.

With a few exceptions, new beads are not considered to have the mystic associations of the ancient beads, but it is considered possible to give new dzi similar powers with some time and effort: 1) by taking them to be blessed by a lama or guru; 2) taking them on pilgrimages to holy places such as stupas and shrines; and 3) reciting mantras, as well as taking religious vows with them. An advantage of new dzi beads is that they do not carry any of the bad karma of previous owners. It is considered possible to rid a stone of bad energy by submerging it in saltwater for several hours, and then fanning incense over it. The dzi should be treated with respect from that time on. Sun basking and herbal smudging are also said to purify the beads.   Spirit aroma offering and recitation of Cintamani dharani are considered helpful in charging the bead as well.

Imitation dzi 
Imitation dzi are created from materials other than agate or chalcedony. They can be made of glass, resin, lampwork, wood, bone, plastic, metal, or non-traditional etched stones. Imitation dzi have a long history, some dating back a couple of hundred years. The older mock dzi have some collectible value. Some of the resin mock dzi have a filling of lead to add weight.

Some people would also call the modern machine-carved and machine-drilled, highly polished new dzi "mock dzi." Almost invariably mass-produced, these are available for less than two dollars, and are often sold by the strand. The etching on these cheap beads has been done very quickly, and the decorations do not penetrate into the inner core of the bead. These are usually targeted for sale to mainland Chinese customers as lucky feng shui charms.

Value
Market value for ancient beads can easily reach into hundreds of thousands of US dollars - especially for beads with more "eyes." Tiny red spots caused by iron inclusion in the agate also increase the value. New dzi prices range from about ten to two thousand US Dollars, depending on quality and luster.

Similar  beads

Similar to dzi beads are the so-called chung dzi, which have been imported to Tibet since ancient times. These can be plain, naturally banded agate beads, or etched beads (often with black and white striped patterns). Some are carnelians or black agate with thin white etching patterns resembling the back of a turtle, which is an ancient pattern that dates back to the era of the Harappan Indus culture.  Ancient Roman agate beads as well as etched Bactrian, Middle Eastern, Chinese, Afghan, Yemeni, and Indian agate and carnelian beads made their way into Tibet. All these are considered chung dzi (in Tibetan, "chung" means ordinary or common). Chung dzi are believed to have similar properties to real "eyed" dzi; they are less valuable, but they are highly prized by Tibetans and also considered a variety of dzi.

Another similar type of bead is called Luk Mik ("goat’s eye") - it is a naturally formed "one-eyed" coin-shaped agate (pictured). Luk Mik are the preferred dzi for travelling in Tibet.

The antique Pyu and Phumtek beads of Burma are also similar in some ways to dzi: they share some of the dzi bead patterns, but instead of agate, the Phumtek are generally made from petrified opalized palm wood, while Pyu beads are often made of red or orange carnelian with some thin white alkali-etched lines.

See also
Aqeeq
Evil Eye
Hamsa
Nazar (amulet)
Thogchag

References

Further reading
Ebbinghouse, David and Winsten, Michael (1988). "Tibetan dZi (gZi) Beads". The Tibet Journal 13 (1): pp. 38–56.
Bolin, Tilii (2018). "The Complete Book of Dzi Beads ".
Norbu, Namkhai (1981). "The Necklace of Zi". (Shang Shung Edizioni)

Tibetan culture
Beadwork
Tibetan Buddhist art and culture
Amulets